Canaveilles is a commune in the Pyrénées-Orientales department in southern France.

Geography 
Canaveilles is located in the canton of Les Pyrénées catalanes and in the arrondissement of Prades. Olette-Canaveilles-les-Bains station has rail connections to Villefranche-de-Conflent and Latour-de-Carol.

Population

See also
Communes of the Pyrénées-Orientales department

References

Communes of Pyrénées-Orientales